Cișmea may refer to several villages in Romania:

 Cișmea, a village in Țițești Commune, Argeș County
 Cișmea, a village in Răchiți Commune, Botoșani County

and to a village in Moldova:
 Cișmea, a village Pelivan Commune, Orhei district